Massif des Brasses is a mid-sized ski area in the Haute-Savoie region of France. The ski area is located in the commune of Saint-Jeoire, at the head of the Giffre valley. It is marketed as a close ski destination to Geneva, with a claimed transfer time of 20 minutes from the Genevan basin.

References

External links

Ski areas in France
Sports venues in Haute-Savoie